Tepidanaerobacter is a genus of anaerobic, moderately thermophilic, syntrophic bacteria from the family Tepidanaerobacteraceae.

References

Further reading 
 
 
 
 

 

Thermoanaerobacterales
Bacteria genera
Thermophiles
Anaerobes